Agostino Viale (Genova, 1692 - Genova, 1777) was the 160th Doge of the Republic of Genoa.

Biography 
Son of Benedetto Viale, doge of the Genoese republic in the period 1717-1719, he was born in Genoa in 1692 and baptized in the Basilica Santa Maria delle Vigne. Viale received school education in Rome, at the Collegio Clementino. On 10 March 1750 he was elected by the Grand Council as the new doge of the Republic of Genoa, the one hundred and fifteenth in biennial succession and the one hundred and sixtieth in republican history. And the expenses for his coronation ceremony, from the banquet to the cost of the new customs liveries created for the occasion, were considered excessive by a part of the nobility for the Genoese coffers, considering the substantial monetary heritage of the neo doge. No details or important facts are known of the Dogate of Viale, a mandate which ended March 10, 1752. He died in Genoa in 1777.

See also 

 Republic of Genoa
 Doge of Genoa

References 

18th-century Doges of Genoa
1692 births
1777 deaths